The Bomu Hunting Reserve (French: Domaine de Chasse Bomu) is a hunting reserve (IUCN Category II) in the Democratic Republic of the Congo. The reserve covers an area of 4,125.6 km. It is bounded by the Mbomou River on the north, which forms the border with the Central African Republic. It adjoins Bili-Uere Hunting Reserve to the south.

References

Protected areas of the Democratic Republic of the Congo
Bas-Uélé
Northern Congolian forest–savanna mosaic